The Ranfurly Shield, colloquially known as the Log o' Wood, is perhaps the most prestigious trophy in New Zealand's domestic rugby union competition. First played for in 1904, the Ranfurly Shield is based on a challenge system, rather than a league or knockout competition as with most football trophies. The holding union must defend the Shield in challenge matches, and if a challenger defeats them, they become the new holder of the Shield.

Holders
Only two teams held the Ranfurly Shield from 1904–1909:

Fixtures

1904

1905

1906

1907

1908

1909

References
 http://www.scrum.co.nz/Ranfurly_Shield_Matches.asp

1904–09
1904 in New Zealand rugby union
1905 in New Zealand rugby union
1906 in New Zealand rugby union
1907 in New Zealand rugby union
1908 in New Zealand rugby union
1909 in New Zealand rugby union